Ron O'Brien (born 6 December 1942) is  a former Australian rules footballer who played with Richmond in the Victorian Football League (VFL).

Notes

External links 		
		

Living people
1942 births
Australian rules footballers from Victoria (Australia)
Richmond Football Club players